Supersize She is a 2005 television documentary focused on British professional female bodybuilder Joanna Thomas.  The title was a take-off on the success of the film Super Size Me.  The one-hour program premiered at the MIPTV in April 2005. Since airing on Channel 5, it has been sold and distributed to over 30 countries.

Plot

Early life
Joanna was born on December 12, 1976, in Truro, Cornwall, England, U.K. At the age of 15 she began bodybuilding. She broke a world record when she became the youngest British female bodybuilder to turn IFBB pro, at the age of 21, in a sport in which over 10,000 women compete at amateur level worldwide. At the age of 27, Joanna moves to Los Angeles, California. Joanna's goal is to win the Ms. Olympia title and retire on the top.

Training
Over the next five months, Joanna begins her training and dieting for the 2004 GNC Show of Strength. She endures regular massage secessions that tear her muscles, which is although painful, but makes her muscles grow larger.  Another prominent female bodybuilder featured was Debbie Bramwell, who is a friend of Joanna, helps Joanna train at the gym. When the issue of steroids was brought up, Joanna sarcastically said that "Yeah it's all about the steroids, you know. We just take steroids and look like this. Try this at home everyone, for a few weeks, and see how you look." She visits her nutritionist to measure her body fat. Joanna's body fat goal is to get herself at 3% body fat. Her body weight came in at 2.6%. She lost a total of 30 lbs in 6 weeks.

Modeling
Due to poor funding in professional female bodybuilding, Joanna main source of income is modeling for her website that is consistently updated with pictures and videos of her, which is her sole source of income. It's a members only website where those members pay $25 for her content. Joanna explains that there is no way for her to get a job and work several hours a week and be a professional female bodybuilder because it would be too stressful.

2004 GNC Show of Strength
In order to qualify for the 2004 Ms. Olympia, Joanna must come in first or second place at the GNC Show of Strength. There are about over 70 professional female bodybuilders in the world and each are eager for recognition by attending the Ms. Olympia. Joanna and Debbie travel to Atlanta for Joanna to compete in the 2004 GNC Show of Strength. Joanna commented that Jeannie Paparone had a nice shape to her and she could be hard for her to beat. Other predominate professional female bodybuilders include Yaxeni Oriquen-Garcia, Mily Pena, Nancy Lewis, Rosemary Jennings, Gayle Moher, Mary Ellen Doss, Monica Martin, Angela Debatin, Michelle David, Mary Ellen Jerumbo, and Elizabeth Gomez. Debbie Bramwell, although did not compete herself, was with Joanna backstage helping her prepare and encouraging her. Before the show, all of the female bodybuilder would eat sugary food and work out with weights in order to show off their veins. While performing, bodybuilders are dehydrated and at their weakest so performing poses is very tiring and strenuous.

At the end of the first round, the judges pick out their top three favorites, which is a strong indicator of final placing. Nancy Lewis was picked first, Rosemary Jennings was picked second, and Joanna Thomas was picked third. After preparation backstage for the final round, Joanna came on stage in a pink bikini and posed to the song Barbie Girl. During posedown, Joanna, along with Nancy Lewis, Rosemary Jennings, Gayle Moher, Mary Doss, and Jeannie Paparone began performing free form poses and try to over-shine their competitors for the judges to see. At the end of the GNC Show of Strength, Joanna came in 2nd place, with Nancy Lewis winning the lightweight title. Joanna won $2,000 dollars at the GNC.

The final results for the 2004 GNC Show of Strength:

2004 Ms. Olympia
After finishing the 2004 GNC Show of Strength, Joanna returns to Los Angeles where her parents sent her video of her 1997 EFBB Northeast Qualifier, her first female bodybuilding competition, where she placed first in middleweight. Joanna travels to Las Vegas to compete in the 2004 Ms. Olympia. On the night before the contest, bodybuilding fans get to meet with their bodybuilding heroes. Along with Joanna, Betty Pariso, and Dayana Cadeau are seen. Dayana Cadeau boasts that nobody that in her class can beat her. Joanna spends the next 12 hours of fasting and dehydrating before the competition. Her parents and from England flew out to Las Vegas to see and support her. Debbie Bramwell also came to support her. If Joanna did win the 2004 Ms. Olympia she would only win $10,000, a fraction of the $120,000 that would be won by the 2004 Mr. Olympia winner.

After five months of training and dieting, Joanna takes part in the 2004 Ms. Olympia. During the first round, Joanna was not picked among the top six. She only has the evening show left to improve her chances. At the end of the next round of posing, Joanna did not place in the top three in the lightweight class, much to her and her parents disappointment.  The next day, at her apartment, Joanna calls the Olympia judge and asks where she was placed at the Olympia and she was told she placed 7th place. At the end of the documentary, Joanna was more determined than ever to win the Ms. Olympia title.

The final results for the 2004 Ms. Olympia:

Cast
 Joanna Thomas
 Debbie Bramwell-Washington
 Jeannie Paparone
 Yaxeni Oriquen-Garcia
 Mily Pena
 Nancy Lewis
 Rosemary Jennings
 Gayle Moher
 Mary Ellen Doss
 Monica Martin
 Angela Debatin
 Michelle David
 Mary Ellen Jerumbo
 Elizabeth Gomez
 Betty Pariso
 Dayana Cadeau

Reviews
Reviews have been written for Supersize She from The Independent, Liverpool Echo, The Beachwood Reporter, and The Daily Telegraph.

See also 
 2004 Ms. Olympia

References

External links 

 

2005 in bodybuilding
2005 television films
2005 films
British television documentaries
Channel 5 (British TV channel) original programming
Documentary films about female bodybuilding
Documentary films about sportspeople
TLC (TV network) original programming
History of female bodybuilding
British sports documentary films
2000s British films